Selkirkiella ventrosa is a species of comb-footed spider in the family Theridiidae. It is found in Chile, Argentina, and the Falklands.

References

Theridiidae
Spiders described in 1849
Spiders of South America